Johann Baring (born 15 November 1697 in Bremen Duchies of Bremen and Verden, died 1748 in West Country, England), later anglicised to John Baring, was a German-British merchant. He came to England in 1717 as an immigrant, as the apprentice of a wool merchant. His decision to settle permanently in England started the Baring family on the road to becoming one of the leading family banking firms in the world.

Early life 
Johann Baring was born in Bremen, one of the old Hanseatic cities of northern Germany. He was the posthumous son of Franz Baring (1657–1697), a professor of theology in Bremen, who died aged forty only a few weeks before Johann was born, by his wife Rebecca Vogds, the daughter of one of Bremen's leading wool merchants. Following the early death of Johann's father, he was brought up by the Vogds family.

Move to England 
At the age of twenty Johann was sent to England to learn the wool trade in Exeter, Devon. Originally having planned to return to Bremen after his apprenticeship, he decided to stay in England, where he obtained citizenship in 1723 and Anglicised his first name from Johann to John.

Marriage and progeny
John married Elizabeth Vowler (1702–1766), the daughter of a prosperous Exeter grocer, who  brought with her a large dowry of £20,000 and business sense to match that of her new husband. By Elizabeth he had the following progeny, 4 sons and 1 daughter: 
John Baring (1730–1816), who in partnership with his younger brother Francis, established the London merchant house of John and Francis Baring Company, which eventually became Barings Bank
Thomas Baring (1733–1758)
Sir Francis Baring, 1st Baronet (1740–1810), who in partnership with his elder brother John, established the London merchant house of John and Francis Baring Company, which eventually became Barings Bank
Charles Baring (1742–1829), 4th son, of Courtland, Exmouth, Devon, who married Margaret Gould (1743–1803), daughter and eventual heiress in her issue of William Drake Gould (1719–1767) of Lew Trenchard. Her monument survives in Lympstone Church, Devon. The Gould family was descended from a certain John Gold, a crusader present at the siege of Damietta in 1217 who for his valour  was granted in 1220 by Ralph de Vallibus an estate at Seaborough in Somerset. His son William Baring (d. 1846), JP, DL, in 1795 assumed by royal licence the additional surname and arms of Gould, in accordance with the terms of his inheritance of the manor of Lew Trenchard. William's grandson was the author Rev. Sabine Baring-Gould (1834–1924) of Lew Trenchard.
Elizabeth Baring (1744–1809) who in 1780 married John Dunning (1731–1783) of Ashburton, Devon, MP for Calne, who in 1782 was created Baron Ashburton.

Residences
By 1737 the Barings moved from the City of Exeter and purchased as their country residence  Larkbeare House, (a substantial 16th century house a fragment of which survives at no. 38 Holloway Street, Exeter, having been largely demolished by 19th century road-widening) and thirty seven acres of land, then just outside the city. Adjacent to Larkbeare was the estate of Mount Radford, which was later the family's residence.  Shortly before his death John purchased Lindridge House, Bishopsteignton, near Exeter.

Death
By the time of John's death aged fifty-one, the Barings were one of the wealthiest families in the West Country. Baring Crescent, Exeter, developed with Regency villas 1818–1828, was named after the family.

Family tree

References

External links 
 Portrait of John Baring by William Hoare, courtesy of the Baring archive
 Portrait of Elizabeth Baring by Thomas Gainsborough, courtesy of the Baring archive

1697 births
1748 deaths
John
Businesspeople from Bremen
German emigrants to the Kingdom of Great Britain
Businesspeople from Exeter